Vin Doolan (born 20 August 1952) is a former Australian rules footballer who played with North Melbourne in the Victorian Football League (VFL).

Doolan came to North Melbourne from the Wodonga Football Club in the Ovens & Murray Football League where he won the club best and fairest in 1970.

He shared North Melbourne's goal-kicking award with Sam Kekovich in 1972, despite kicking only 19 goals. It was the lowest tally to top the club's goal-kicking since 1937.

Doolan was captain coach of Wangaratta from 1979 to 1981.

References

External links
 
 

1952 births
Australian rules footballers from Victoria (Australia)
North Melbourne Football Club players
Wodonga Football Club players
Living people